The 1971 Cork Intermediate Football Championship was the 36th staging of the Cork Intermediate Football Championship since its establishment by the Cork County Board in 1909. The draw for the opening round fixtures took place on 31 January 1971. The championship began on 16 May 1971 and ended on 19 September 1971.

The final was played on 19 September 1971 at Cloughduv GAA Grounds, between Newcestown and St. Finbarr's, in what was their first ever final meeting. Newcestown won the match by 2-11 to 3-02 to claim their first ever championship title.

Results

First round

Quarter-finals

Semi-finals

Final

References

Cork Intermediate Football Championship